is a station in Masuda, Shimane Prefecture, Japan.

Lines
West Japan Railway Company (JR West)
Sanin Main Line

Layout
The station has a side platform and two tracks.

References

Railway stations in Japan opened in 1923
Railway stations in Shimane Prefecture
Sanin Main Line